State elections were held in the Free State of Prussia on 24 April 1932 to elect all 423 members of the Landtag of Prussia. They were the last free election in Prussia, as the next election in 1933 took place under the Nazi regime, and Prussia was then abolished after World War II.

The election saw the Nazi Party become the largest party in Prussia, winning 36% of the vote. The coalition of the Social Democratic Party, Centre Party, and German Democratic Party (now the German State Party), which had governed Prussia since 1919, lost its majority. The SPD, DNVP, and DVP all suffered huge losses. The Wirtschaftspartei lost all its seats, while the DVP and DStP were left with only a handful each. The Centre Party stayed steady, and the Communist Party made minor gains.

The resulting Landtag was divided between the SPD–Zentrum–DStP coalition, the Nazi–DNVP bloc, and the Communist Party. Prussia used the constructive vote of no confidence, meaning a government could be removed from office only if there was a positive majority for a prospective successor. No parliamentary force held a majority, but since none were willing to cooperate with any of the others, the SPD-led coalition could not be removed. It continued in office as a minority government.

This situation ended with the Preußenschlag on 20 July 1932. Reich President Paul von Hindenburg, on the advice of Reich Chancellor Franz von Papen, issued an emergency decree under Article 48 of the Weimar Constitution dissolving the Prussian government and giving von Papen direct control over Prussia as Reichskommissar. Prussia remained under direct control of the federal government until April 1933 when, at the behest of Adolf Hitler under the Enabling Act of 1933, state elections were held. The Nazis failed to win a majority, but the subsequent ban of the Communist Party and arrest of opposition deputies allowed them to secure control of the Landtag regardless, and Hermann Göring became Minister-President. The federal structure of Germany was effectively dissolved under the Nazi regime, and the Prussian government existed only symbolically. After the conclusion of the Second World War, Prussia was dissolved by a declaration of the Allied Control Council on 25 February 1947.

Results

Results by constituency

See also
 Elections in the Free State of Prussia
 Weimar Republic

Notes

References

External links

1932 elections in Germany
1932
April 1932 events